The Immediate Geographic Region of Araxá is one of the 4 immediate geographic regions in the Intermediate Geographic Region of Uberaba, one of the 70 immediate geographic regions in the Brazilian state of Minas Gerais and one of the 509 of Brazil, created by the National Institute of Geography and Statistics (IBGE) in 2017.

Municipalities 
It comprises 8 municipalities.

 Araxá     
 Campos Altos  
 Ibiá   
 Pedrinópolis     
 Perdizes     
 Pratinha     
 Santa Rosa da Serra  
 Tapira

See also 

 List of Intermediate and Immediate Geographic Regions of Minas Gerais

References 

Geography of Minas Gerais